Le Creusot is a commune and industrial town in the Saône-et-Loire department, region of Bourgogne-Franche-Comté, eastern France.

The inhabitants are known as Creusotins. Formerly a mining town, its economy is now dominated by metallurgical companies such as ArcelorMittal, Schneider Electric, and Alstom.

Since the 1990s, the town has been developing its tourism credentials. Its main attraction is the Parc des Combes. The Creusot steam hammer is exposed as a tourist attraction in a square at the entrance to the town from the south.

Le Creusot is also the second educational centre of the Bourgogne (after Dijon), with its IUT and the Condorcet university centre.

History
In 1836, iron ore mines and forges around Le Creusot were bought by Adolphe Schneider and his brother Eugène Schneider. They developed a business in steel, railways, armaments, and shipbuilding. The Schneider empire developed much of the town itself, until it was much reduced in the second half of the twentieth century. It eventually became known as Schneider Electric. The steel forgings for the French nuclear power plants as well as the special alloys for the TGV trains were manufactured in Le Creusot.

On 17 October 1942 the Schneider factory was targeted by the RAF in a daylight raid designated Operation Robinson.

Population

Transport
Le Creusot station is closer to the city centre, and is served by regional trains towards Nevers, Montchanin and Dijon.

Sights
Le pilon – 1877 steam hammer invented by François Bourdon

Château de la Verrerie – Originally the Cristallerie royale of Queen Marie-Antoinette

Personalities
 André Billardon (b.1940), mayor
 Christian Bobin (b. 1951), writer
 François Bourdon (1797–1875), engineer and inventor of the steam hammer le pilon
 Fr. Bruno Cadoré (b. 1954), Dominican priest and current Master of the Order
 Mathilde Carré (1908–2007), French Resistance agent during World War II, who turned double agent
 Marie-Pierre Casey (b.1937) actress
 Jovan Deroko (1912–1941), Serbian Chetnik fighter during World War II
 Sébastien Grax (b. 1984), footballer
 Claudie Haigneré (b. 1957), astronaut
 Catherine Lépront (1951–2012), writer
 Adolphe Schneider (1802–1845), mine owner and entrepreneur
 Eugène Schneider (1805–1875), mine owner and entrepreneur
 Lucien Sergi (b. 1971), former professional footballer
 Anthony da Silva (b. 1980), footballer
 Mickaël Vendetta (b. 1987), Internet celebrity
 John "Iron-Mad" Wilkinson (1728 – 1808) advised Le Creusot on the development of its iron industry
 Marie-Alice Yahé (b. 1984), female rugby player
 Deng Xiaoping (1904–1997), Chinese leader who briefly worked at the Le Creusot Iron and Steel Plant in the 1920s

International relations

Le Creusot is twinned with:
 Bor, Serbia.
 Blieskastel, Germany [1989].
 Rumia, Poland.

See also
Communes of the Saône-et-Loire department

References

External links

 Official website 

Communes of Saône-et-Loire
Burgundy